Rajib Banerjee (b 1974) is an Indian politician who served as the Minister for Forest Affairs in the Government of West Bengal. He was a former Minister in charge of Irrigation & Waterways (2011–2018), and Tribal affairs & backwards classes (2018–2019). He was elected to West Bengal Vidhan Sabha as MLA of Domjur seat in 2011 and 2016 as a member of Trinamool Congress.

On January 29, 2021, he resigned his MLA post of Domjur assembly constituency. Next day he joined Bharatiya Janata Party.

He rejoined All India Trinamool Congress on 31 October 2021.

Education

Banerjee is a postgraduate and achieved MBA From IIME in the year 1995. He has also done a Diploma in Computer Application from St. Xavier's Computer Centre in the year 1990 and Honours Graduate from St. Xavier's College in the year 1988.

References

External links 
Member's List West Bengal Legislative Assembly

 

 

 

1974 births
Living people
West Bengal politicians
West Bengal MLAs 2011–2016
West Bengal MLAs 2016–2021
State cabinet ministers of West Bengal
Trinamool Congress politicians from West Bengal